Zhemchuzhny (Nörys) is a rural locality (a settlement) in Kebratskoye Rural Settlement, Gaynsky District, Perm Krai, Russia. The population was 240 as of 2010. There are 9 streets.

Geography 
Zhemchuzhny is located 96 km northwest of Gayny (the district's administrative centre) by road. Verkhny Budym is the nearest rural locality.

References 

Rural localities in Gaynsky District